Hiroshi H. Miyamura (October 6, 1925 – November 29, 2022) was a United States Army soldier and a recipient of the Medal of Honor, the United States military's highest award for valor, for his actions during the Korean War.
He was one of the last two surviving Medal of Honor recipients of the Korean War, along with Ralph Puckett Jr. While he was held as a prisoner of war, the award was classified as top secret.

Early life
Hiroshi Miyamura was born in Gallup, New Mexico, to Yaichi Miyamura (June 3, 1888 – December 23, 1965) and Tori Matsukawa (December 10, 1896 – August 20, 1936), Japanese immigrant parents, making him a Nisei, a second-generation Japanese American. His parents had moved there in 1923 and bought a 24-hour diner. He was the fourth of nine children. His mother died when he was 11. He got the nickname "Hershey" because one of his teachers could not pronounce his first name correctly.

Military service

World War II
When the United States entered World War II, President Franklin D. Roosevelt ordered the relocation and internment of Japanese Americans due to fears that some would turn out to be traitors. However, for communities outside the sensitive coastal "military zone", this was not mandatory, and local authorities could not decide what they wanted to do. In Gallup, the Japanese-American residents were left alone.

Miyamura joined the United States Army in January 1945. He volunteered to be part of the all-Nisei 100th Infantry Battalion, 442nd Infantry Regiment, where he trained as a machine gunner. This army unit was mostly made up of Japanese-Americans from Hawaii and the mainland. He was discharged from the army shortly after Japan surrendered. He later enlisted in the United States Army Reserve.

Korean War
Miyamura was recalled to active duty following the start of the Korean War, arriving in North Korea in November 1950. He was awarded the Medal of Honor for his actions on April 24–25, 1951, south of the Imjin River near Taejon-ni (Daejeon-ni) in Yeoncheon County, while serving as a corporal in the 2nd Battalion, 7th Infantry Regiment, 3rd Infantry Division. During a night attack by the Chinese, he saw that his squad could not hold much longer, so he ordered his men to retreat. He remained behind to cover their withdrawal, killing an estimated minimum of fifty invading Chinese forces.

Miyamura was captured immediately after the actions that led to his award. As he and other prisoners of war (POWs) were marched away, he helped his wounded friend Joe Annello keep moving, but the North Koreans threatened to shoot him if he did not leave Annello behind. Straggling POWs were routinely killed. Miyamura refused, but Annello himself convinced Miyamura to put him down. Annello survived the war and later visited Miyamura in Gallup. The POWs were forced to march  over five weeks with little food.

Miyamura's was the first Medal of Honor to be classified Top Secret. As Brigadier General Ralph Osborne explained to Miyamura and a group of reporters upon notifying them of his medal, "If the Reds knew what he had done to a good number of their soldiers just before he was taken prisoner, they might have taken revenge on this young man. He might not have come back."

Miyamura was held for 28 months. Following his release on August 20, 1953, he was informed that he had been awarded the Medal of Honor and promoted to sergeant. He was repatriated to the United States and honorably discharged from the military shortly thereafter. His medal was presented to him by President Dwight D. Eisenhower in October 1953 at the White House.

Awards and decorations

Medal of Honor

Commendations
Miyamura has been awarded the following:

Personal life and death

Miyamura married Tsuruko "Terry" Tsuchimori (August 13, 1925 – December 10, 2014). He had three children and four grandchildren. One grandchild, Marisa, is an officer in the United States Air Force. He has resided in Gallup, New Mexico, since his discharge from the army, where he established a career as an automobile mechanic and service station owner. Miyamura remained active in supporting fellow veterans including work with the Wounded Warrior Project. Miyamura was a Lifetime Member of Veterans of Foreign Wars Post 1. On Memorial Day 2018, his story was portrayed during the National Memorial Day Concert on the West Lawn of the US Capitol in Washington, D.C.

In recognition of Miyamura's activities involving youth in his community, he received the 2014 Director's Community Leadership Award from the Albuquerque division of the FBI.

As the 2014 Nisei Week Grand Marshal, Miyamura led the Grand Parade on August 10, 2014.

In November 2022, it was announced that Miyamura joined the National Board of the State Funeral for War Veterans organization, which is dedicated to "convince Congress to pass legislation to grant a State Funeral for the last Medal of Honor recipients from the Korean and Vietnam Wars, as a final salute to all the men and women who served."

Miyamura died in Phoenix, Arizona, on November 29, 2022, at the age of 97. He was buried with full military honors at Sunset Memorial Park in Gallup.

Namesakes
In his hometown, Gallup, New Mexico, an area is named Miyamura in his honor, as are Hiroshi H. Miyamura High School and the Miyamura Overpass, an interchange on I-40.

See also
Battle of Yultong
List of Korean War Medal of Honor recipients
Medal of Honor (TV series) - Miyamura is featured in season 1 episode 4

Further reading

References

External links

 
 
 

1925 births
2022 deaths
United States Army non-commissioned officers
United States Army personnel of World War II
United States Army personnel of the Korean War
Korean War recipients of the Medal of Honor
United States Army Medal of Honor recipients
American prisoners of war in the Korean War
American military personnel of Japanese descent
People from Gallup, New Mexico
Military personnel from New Mexico
Recipients of the Order of Military Merit (Korea)